Alangayam is a Selection Grade Town Panchayat in Tirupathur district  in the state of Tamil Nadu, India. It is located at 18 km from Vaniyambadi.

Alangayam is 8 km from the famous Vainu Bappu Observatory in Kavalur. This town is surrounded by mountains on all sides, which keeps Alangayam at a moderate temperature for most of the year.

Alangayam comprises villages named Kalai Koil, Peddur, Badakuppam, Pulugarpalli, Gejjaloor, Bunkur, Rajapalayam, MGR Nagar, Narasingapuram, Kallaraipatti and Konkiyur.

Climate

Demographics
 India census, Alangayam had a population of 16,851. Males constitute 50% of the population and females 50%.  13% of the population is under 6 years of age.
Kavalur, the place where Asia's second largest Observatory is situated 8 km from Alangayam. It is in the foot of Yelagiri Hill and Javadu Hills of Tirupathur district. Alangayam is surrounded by forests which is an integral part of disturbed Eastern Ghats.

Transport 
Alangayam has a bus station which connects to many cities, including Thirupattur and Vaniyambadi. From these, it is possible to get connections to Vellore and other major cities in Tamil Nadu.

Adjacent communities

References

Cities and towns in Vellore district